The Hero Honda Masters was a professional golf tournament on the Asian Tour from 1997 to 2003.

In 2000 and 2003 it was hosted by the Delhi Golf Club and won by Arjun Atwal.

Winners

References

Golf tournaments in India
Former Asian Tour events